Epibacterium mobile is a bacterium from the genus of Epibacterium.

References 

Rhodobacteraceae
Bacteria described in 2007